Zeta Delta Xi ( or Zete) is a local, co-educational fraternity at Brown University in Providence, Rhode Island. It traces its origins to 1852 as the Epsilon chapter of the all-male national fraternity Zeta Psi. In 1982, the Epsilon chapter decided to admit women as brothers. This led to the chapter's disassociation from Zeta Psi in 1986, and the birth of Zeta Delta Xi on 24 January 1987.  A shortened version of its name, "Zete", is commonly used to refer to the fraternity or a member.

History

Origins as Zeta Psi

Zeta Delta Xi began life as the Epsilon chapter of the national, all-male fraternity Zeta Psi. "The Epsilon chapter was founded at Brown University on April 21, 1852, through the efforts of two Delta chapter Zetes, from the young chapter at Rutgers. Epsilon was the eighth Zeta Psi chapter in the nation and the sixth fraternity to take root at Brown University.

For the next one hundred thirty years, the Epsilon chapter of Zeta Psi remained a fixture of life at Brown University. The activities of the Epsilon chapter during the late nineteenth and early twentieth centuries are rather poorly documented; however, it is known that three members were expelled from Brown University in 1876 for "voluptuous activities." In 1916 when "at Brown, the new quadrangle buildings arrangement threatened to abolish fraternities," Zeta Psi moved into a house at 48 College Street. This remained its quarters until the 1940s, when Zeta Psi IHQ sold their house to the university and expelled them from the organization, they then moved into on-campus housing around the newly constructed Wriston Quad. The old Zeta Psi house is now MacFarlane House and is home to the Classics Department at Brown University.

Going co-ed and the birth of Zeta Delta Xi

In 1982, the Epsilon chapter decided to expand its membership to include women. Although the Zeta Psi national organization acquiesced in the Epsilon chapter'''s decision to admit women as local members, it still refused to recognize women as members of the national organization because Zeta Psi's national constitution prohibited women from becoming brothers. Restricting women to local membership had two significant consequences: it barred women from participating in certain Zeta Psi ceremonies, and prohibited women from becoming officers within the local chapter.

The chapter's members nonetheless officially began considering women as full brothers (including electing women as officers) in defiance of Zeta Psi's national constitution. In 1986, they elected a female president and arranged to have her represent the chapter at the Zeta Psi national convention,"leaving no question about the full and legitimate membership of women".  The national organization threatened to revoke the chapter's charter if it did not bring itself back into compliance with the national constitution. On December 10, 1986, the Epsilon chapter decided that it could not justify membership in a national fraternity that did not recognize all of its members, and voted unanimously to withdraw from Zeta Psi.

Within weeks after receiving the Epsilon chapter's letter of withdrawal, Zeta Psi declared the Epsilon chapter dead. Despite its long history, including the 1973 endowment of the Wright D. Heydon (Epsilon '11) Memorial Fund "for the benefit of the Epsilon chapter and such other educational purposes as the Foundation Trustees deemed appropriate," the national headquarters dispatched agents to collect nearly all property at the chapter house—ranging from couches and televisions to photographs of past members. "The total gift of $275,000 was to that time, and still remains to this day, the largest single gift ever received by Zeta Psi."

On 24 January 1987, all of the members of the Epsilon chapter'' formed a new organization known as Zeta Delta Xi: a local co-ed fraternity, independent of Zeta Psi. Its inclusive practices are reflected in the diversity of its pledge classes and membership rolls.

Zeta Delta Xi since 1987

Since 1987, Zeta Delta Xi has thrived on campus, with a membership drawn from people of many diverse interests and backgrounds. In 1994, for instance, it was the first fraternity at Brown University to elect an openly gay man (Cristobal Modesto '95) as president.

Many Zetes   continue their relationship with the house beyond their undergraduate years. Many of the alums make regular pilgrimages back to Zete in January, to celebrate the anniversary of their founding, and in May, to watch younger members graduate.

Notable alumni

 Kid Beyond (Andrew Chaikin), vocal artist and singer
 Eric Chaikin, director and tournament scrabble player
 Brian Floca, children's book author and illustrator
 Aaron Schatz, founder of Football Outsiders
 Mike Zahalsky, contestant on Survivor Season 35, Survivor: Heroes vs. Healers vs. Hustlers
 Zanagee Artis, climate activist
 Stefanie Lyn Kaufman-Mthimkhulu, founder of Project LETS, a disability advocacy and support organization

Traditions

 On Friday afternoon of Spring Weekend every year, Zete throws SpagFest - students spend several hours eating spaghetti and garlic bread and drinking beer, wine, and soda.
 Each year during commencement, current brothers and alumni gather on the steps of 48 College Street, the former fraternity house, to cheer the graduating seniors.
 Starting in 2005, Zete cooperated with Alpha Epsilon Pi, with whom they shared a building, to throw Oktoberfest, with hot dogs, kielbasa, and German beer.

References

External links
Zeta Delta Xi Website
Encyclopedia Brunoniana on Fraternities

Local fraternities and sororities
Brown University organizations
Fraternities and sororities in the United States
Student organizations established in 1987
1987 establishments in Rhode Island